David Tutera's Celebrations (originally titled My Fair Wedding) is an American reality television series on WE tv starring David Tutera, a wedding planner for celebrities. In the show, women send videos to Tutera asking for help planning their events. After selecting the woman, he goes to help them, and puts his own touch to the plans, creating a "dream event" for each woman. He makes his alterations with just three weeks before each woman's event.

The show premiered in October 2008 under the title My Fair Wedding. The first two seasons profiled women and weddings in the New York City metro area, while the third took the series on the road, helping brides-to-be in Dallas and Los Angeles, among other places. The series' title was changed to My Fair Wedding: Unveiled for season 5. It was announced in March 2013 that the series has been renewed for an eight episode sixth season and that features all types of events, not just limited to weddings. Season 6 also features another series title change to David Tutera: Unveiled. It premiered on September 7, 2013.

The seventh season brings a third series title change to David Tutera's CELEBrations.  Season 7 will consist of seventeen episodes and follows Tutera as he helps Hollywood stars plan their events. Clients this season include Brandy Norwood, Ray J, Lil Kim, Taylor Armstrong, and Amy Weber's twins. It premiered on August 1, 2014.

Episodes

Series overview

Season 1 (2008)

Season 2 (2009)

Season 3 (2010–11)

Season 4 (2011–12)

Season 5 (2012)

Season 6 (2013)

Season 7 (2014–15)

Season 8 (2015–16; 2018)

References

External links
 

2000s American reality television series
2010s American reality television series
2008 American television series debuts
Wedding television shows
Television shows set in New York City
Television shows set in Los Angeles
Television shows set in Dallas
2018 American television series endings